On 29 January 2021, at around 05:00 EET, a fire broke out at the COVID-19 facility in the  in Bucharest, Romania, killing five people. On 4 February 2021, the death toll on the fire was reported to have risen to 12. The death toll rose again to 14 on 6 February 2021, with one more death added to the death toll on 8 February 2021 and two more again on 9 February 2021.

See also
 COVID-19 pandemic in Romania
 List of building or structure fires
 Piatra Neamț hospital fire
 Constanța hospital fire

References

2021 disasters in Romania
2021 fires in Europe
COVID-19 pandemic in Romania
January 2021 events in Romania
Hospital fires in Romania
21st century in Bucharest